The City novels is a series of five books published between 1960–1968 by Swedish author Per Anders Fogelström. The series describes Stockholm from 1860 to 1968.

The novels were translated to English by Jennifer Brown Bäverstam.

References 

Novel series
Historical novels by series
20th-century Swedish novels
Novels set in Stockholm
Family saga novels
Swedish-language novels
Book series introduced in 1960
Novels set in the 19th century
Novels set in the 20th century